Sandfields may refer to:
Sandfields, Swansea
Sandfields, Port Talbot
 Sandfields, a suburb in the city of Lichfield, Staffordshire

See also 
 Sandfield (disambiguation)